Buckland Coach House & Ice House is a Site of Special Scientific Interest in Brecknock, Powys, Wales. These are part of the grounds of Buckland House and have been leased into the care of the Vincent Wildlife Trust.

The Coach House is home to a breeding population of at least 400 adult lesser horseshoe bats. The Ice House provides a winter hibernation site, with 300 or more lesser horseshoe bats using it most years.

See also
List of Sites of Special Scientific Interest in Brecknock

References

Sites of Special Scientific Interest in Brecknock
Ice trade